Calytrix pulchella is a species of plant in the myrtle family Myrtaceae that is endemic to Western Australia.

It usually blooms between August and November producing pink star-shaped flowers.

Found on ridges and flats in a scattered area in the southern Wheatbelt and Great Southern regions of Western Australia where it grows on sandy soils.

References

Plants described in 1895
pulchella
Flora of Western Australia